Cybaeidae is a family of spiders first described by Nathan Banks in 1892. The diving bell spider or water spider Argyroneta aquatica was previously included in this family, but is now in the family Dictynidae.

Genera

, the World Spider Catalog accepts the following extant genera:

Allocybaeina Bennett, 2020
Blabomma Chamberlin & Ivie, 1937 — United States, Korea
Calymmaria Chamberlin & Ivie, 1937 — United States, Canada, Mexico
Cedicoides Charitonov, 1946 — Turkmenistan, Tajikistan, Uzbekistan
Cedicus Simon, 1875 — Asia
Cryphoeca Thorell, 1870 — Asia, Europe, North America
Cryphoecina Deltshev, 1997 — Montenegro
Cybaeina Chamberlin & Ivie, 1932 — United States
Cybaeota Chamberlin & Ivie, 1933 — United States, Canada
Cybaeozyga Chamberlin & Ivie, 1937 — United States
Cybaeus L. Koch, 1868 — Asia, North America, Europe, Peru
Dirksia Chamberlin & Ivie, 1942 — United States, France
Ethobuella Chamberlin & Ivie, 1937 — United States, Canada
Neocryphoeca Roth, 1970 — United States
Paracedicus Fet, 1993 — Asia
Symposia Simon, 1898 — Venezuela, Colombia
Tuberta Simon, 1884 — Azerbaijan, Italy
Vagellia Simon, 1899 — Indonesia
Willisus Roth, 1981 — United States
Yorima Chamberlin & Ivie, 1942 — United States, Cuba

A fossil genus is also placed in this family:
 †Vectaraneus Selden, 2003 (Isle of Wight)

See also
 List of Cybaeidae species

References

 
Araneomorphae families